United States v. AT&T was the antitrust case in the United States that led to the 1982 Bell System divestiture, the breakup of the old American Telephone & Telegraph into the new, seven regional Bell operating companies (RBOC)s and the much smaller new AT&T.

Background
In the 1970s, the Federal Communications Commission suspected that the American Telephone and Telegraph Company was using monopoly profits from its Western Electric subsidiary to subsidize the costs of its network, which was contrary to U.S. antitrust law. The case was filed by the United States Department of Justice in 1974.

Settlement
In 1978, Judge Harold H. Greene of the United States District Court for the District of Columbia, on his first day on the bench, took over the case. It was settled in 1982 by the means of a consent decree between AT&T and the Department of Justice, called the Modification of Final Judgment as agreed by AT&T Chairman Charles L. Brown.

Notes

References  
 Citation: 552 F. Supp. 131 (D. D.C. 1982).
 Coll, Steve (1986), The Deal of the Century:  The Breakup of AT&T, New York:  Atheneum.
 Yurick, William. Judge Harold H. Greene: A Pivotal Judicial Figure in Telecommunications Policy and His Legacy  

United States antitrust case law
Bell System
1982 in United States case law
AT&T litigation